Clockwork Knight 2, known in Japan as , is a side-scrolling platform video game developed and published by Sega for the Sega Saturn. It is the sequel to Clockwork Knight, a title also released for the Sega Saturn, and features virtually identical gameplay mechanics. Despite this, many critics deemed it a dramatic improvement over its predecessor, citing improved replay value and pacing. A second sequel, the working titles for which included Clockwork Knight 3: Pengin War and Clockwork Knight Puzzle, used gameplay similar to the Bomberman series, but never made it past the beta stage. Another sequel, titled Knight N' Knight, was scheduled to appear on the GameCube, but never released.

Plot
Clockwork Knight 2 immediately picks up on the cliffhanger left by Clockwork Knight. Chelsea is safe and sound, but will not wake up. As the toys not under the spell ponder just what to do, Chelsea is suddenly kidnapped again. Thus, Pepper again sets out to rescue her...

Gameplay
Clockwork Knight 2 uses identical gameplay to that of its predecessor, right down to using all the same items and having four rooms with two levels each, plus a final boss.

There are some minor additions:
 Four playing cards are scattered around each level. Spinning all four cards gives players a Gold Key; collecting all 32 cards in the game yields a secret code.
 There are some forced scrolling levels in which Pepper rides on the back of his steed Barobaro. Attacking is done not with Pepper's key in these levels, but by firing Barobaro's head at enemies.
 Once in each room, in a hidden location, there is the "Le Bon race", a race against Ginger's servant Le Bon, in which Pepper is rewarded with a gold key after a win (can only win one time in each of the locations, but can repeat it an unrestricted number of times if he didn't win it). In the last area, Clock Tower, instead of the Le Bon race (that always happened on stage 1 on the other locations), there is a pursuit to Prunchau in stage 2, in which Pepper is rewarded, if he didn't lose sight of him, with a giant key that gives him the maximum number of gears (5), and remains with it even after losing lives.
 In the US release of the game, an additional game mode called "Bosses Galore" lets the player control either Pepper or Ginger (who is far more agile and has a faster attack) in fighting all the bosses of both Clockwork Knight games one after the other. Clearing this mode with the "MASTER" rank unlocks a bonus movie titled "The Birth of Pepperouchau" that displays early concept art and test footage, and a code that can be entered on the Bosses Galore main screen to access seven secret mini games.

Reception

Clockwork Knight 2 was well received by reviewers. Maximum assessed that the game is just as short as the original Clockwork Knight, but has much greater replay value, particularly the hidden playing cards. They also hailed the graphics as "far in advance of any other comparable next generation product". Next Generations brief review noted that Clockwork Knight 2 made little change to the formula of the original game, and concluded by simply stating, "If you like CK you are sure to like CK2." The four reviewers of Electronic Gaming Monthly described it as a must-have game for the Saturn. They especially praised the innovative use of both foreground and background playing areas, the impressive graphics, and the numerous secrets. GamePro praised the game for having "some of the best visuals on the Saturn yet" and "excellent jazzy tunes that perfectly complement the action", but felt these did not make up for the routine and overly easy gameplay, saying it "takes the life out of the game." Tom Guise of Sega Saturn Magazine, while criticizing the game's short length, praised the pacing of the gameplay, the impressiveness of the 3D graphics, and the large number of hidden areas and secrets, and summarized that "Clockwork Knight 2 manages to succeed, in every respect, where the original game failed."

References

External links
Clockwork Knight 2 at GameFAQs

1995 video games
Fictional knights in video games
Sega video games
Sega Saturn games
Sega Saturn-only games
Sentient toys in fiction
Video games about toys
Video game sequels
Video games with 2.5D graphics
Video games with pre-rendered 3D graphics
Video games developed in Japan